Ramkripa Ananthan (born 1971) is an Indian car designer, and is head of design at Mahindra & Mahindra.

Career
Ananthan studied Mechanical Engineering at Birla Institute of Technology and Science, Pilani and is a graduate from IDC School of Design and IIT Bombay. She joined Mahindra & Mahindra as an interior designer in 1997, working on the interiors of the Bolero, Scorpio and the Xylo cars.

Notable designs
Ananthan has led the teams on the designs for a number of Mahindra vehicles including:
 Mahindra TUV300
 Mahindra XUV500
 Mahindra XUV300
 Mahindra Marazzo
 Mahindra KUV100
Mahindra XUV700

References

1971 births
Living people
Indian designers